Federalist No. 56 is an essay by James Madison, the fifty-sixth of The Federalist Papers. It was published on February 16, 1788, under the pseudonym Publius, the name under which all The Federalist papers were published. Continuing from Federalist No. 55, this paper discusses the size of the United States House of Representatives. It is titled "The Same Subject Continued: The Total Number of the House of Representatives". In this paper, Madison addresses the criticism that the House of Representatives is too small to sufficiently understand the varied interests of all its constituents.  He goes on further to explain that representatives represent large numbers of people, effectively explaining why the "smaller" size of the House of Representatives was sufficient.

External links 

 Text of The Federalist No. 56: congress.gov

1788 in American law
56
1788 in the United States
1788 essays